The Aguán River; also commonly known by its Spanish name, Rio Aguán) is a river in Honduras. It rises in the Yoro region to the west of San Lorenzo and briefly runs south before turning east-northeast, passing San Lorenzo, Olanchito and Tocoa before entering the Caribbean Sea east of Puerto Castilla.

In 1998 Hurricane Mitch caused to the river to burst its banks at several points along its length. The maximal discharge at Sabá was estimated at almost . The village of Santa Rosa de Aguán was washed away by the river, causing dozens of deaths.

The Aguán River Valley includes the major agricultural area of Bajo Aguán.

See also 
 List of rivers of Honduras

References

Rivers of Honduras